A general election was held in the United Kingdom on Thursday 9 June 1983 and all 72 seats in Scotland were contested.

The Labour Party won 41 seats, with the Conservative Party winning 21, the SDP–Liberal Alliance winning eight and the Scottish National Party winning two.

Results

See also 
 List of MPs for constituencies in Scotland (1983–1987)
 1983 United Kingdom general election in England
 1983 United Kingdom general election in Northern Ireland
 1983 United Kingdom general election in Wales

References 

1983 in Scotland
1980s elections in Scotland
1983
Scotland